Çataklı is a village in the Alacakaya District of Elazığ Province in Turkey. Its population is 767 (2021). The village is populated by Kurds.

References

Villages in Alacakaya District
Kurdish settlements in Elazığ Province